The 2001 Arizona Wildcats football team represented the University of Arizona during the 2001 NCAA Division I-A football season. They were coached by John Mackovic in his first season with the Wildcats, replacing longtime coach Dick Tomey. Arizona finished the year with a record of 5–6 (2–6 against Pac-10 opponents) and again missed the postseason due to a losing record.

The season was mostly affected by the September 11 terrorist attacks, which led to the NCAA cancelling a week of college football in mid-September, and the Wildcats had to regroup and play the rest of the year with pride.

Before the season
After Arizona completed the 2000 season, Tomey resigned as coach due to the inability to get the Wildcats to complete their goal of reaching the Rose Bowl. Arizona had started the season at 5–1, only to lose their remaining games, including the finale against Arizona State, which led to Tomey resigning, despite several rumors that he would be fired. 

Mackovic, the former Illinois and Texas coach, was hired to replace Tomey to rebuild the program. After being introduced, Mackovic promised that the team would be rebuilt with strong recruiting classes and he would lead them to a Rose Bowl, in which Tomey was unable to do. He previously served as Arizona's offensive coordinator under Jim Young from 1973 to 1976.

In addition, Mackovic would also bring in a new coaching staff, as well as bringing back Larry Mac Duff as defensive coordinator (Mac Duff was formerly part of Tomey's staff in the same position and helped build Arizona's “Desert Swarm” defense in the early 1990s). Mac Duff served as the special teams for the NFL's New York Giants, who had reached the Super Bowl in the 2000–01 season (the Giants ultimately lost to the Ravens in the Super Bowl) before returning to Arizona in the offseason.

By the preseason, Arizona was picked to finish in the middle of the Pac-10 standings, though Mackovic was confident that the team would improve despite having a new quarterback.

Schedule

Roster

Game summaries

San Diego State
In Mackovic's debut as Arizona coach, the Wildcats opened the season with a matchup against San Diego State. It was Arizona's first visit to San Diego since they won the Holiday Bowl in 1998. Arizona's offense started slow, but would pick up momentum to get points and the defense shut down the Aztecs to give Mackovic his first win and end the Wildcats’ five-game losing streak (that dated back to the previous year that led to Tomey stepping down).

Idaho
In their home opener, Arizona hosted Idaho. The Wildcats’ offense would dominate, though they would miss a pair of extra points after touchdowns. Mac Duff's defense was “Desert Swarm”-like early, by shutting out the Vandals in the first three quarters. In the fourth, Idaho would mount a furious rally, as Arizona's defense was playing garbage time, but would fall short as the Wildcats held on and Mackovic won his first home game.

UNLV
The Wildcats hosted UNLV in their next game. It was the first meeting between the two schools. The was originally going to be played on September 15, but was postponed a week later along with all other college football games in the wake of the September 11 tragedy.

On the day of the game, Arizona Stadium had heavy security measures due to the aftermath of the 9/11 attacks, as fans entered the stadium. During the pregame, fans held American flags and the stadium observed a moment of silence for the 9/11 victims and the Arizona marching band played the national anthem before kickoff. At halftime, the band, along with UNLV's, performed “God Bless America” and “America the Beautiful” as a symbol of pride.

In the game itself, the Wildcats would outplay the Rebels and Arizona's passing offense dominated on its way to a win and went to 3–0 under Mackovic before entering Pac-10 play.

Oregon
After losing to Washington State to begin conference play, Arizona hosted Oregon (who was ranked seventh). The Wildcats would be no match for the Ducks, as Oregon's offense put up 63 points on the scoreboard. At one point earlier in the game, the score was tied at 14 before the Ducks broke it open, and gave the Wildcats an ugly loss.

Washington
Arizona traveled to Seattle to take on Washington, who was also ranked (15th). The Wildcats would battle the Huskies in a back and forth affair, and took the lead in the fourth quarter. However, Washington was able to drive into Arizona territory and scored in the final minute to give Arizona a painful loss for the second year in a row.

USC
The Wildcats returned home after their heartbreaking loss at Washington and faced USC (who, like Arizona, had a first-year head coach). The Trojans would dominate early, and led 31–13 at halftime before the Wildcats stormed back in the second half to tie the game at 34 in the fourth quarter. Late in the quarter, Arizona had an opportunity to take the lead. However, they would throw an interception that USC returned for a touchdown that gave the Trojans the lead back. The Wildcats would have one last chance in the closing seconds, but ended up being stopped and Arizona fell short again for their fifth straight loss, which tied the same streak that ended the previous season. It was also their tenth consecutive Pac-10 loss that also dated back to 2000.

A memorable moment occurred early in the fourth quarter, as the Arizona Stadium PA announced gave an update on the World Series score between the Diamondbacks and Yankees (the first game of the series was played on the same day of the Arizona-USC game). When it was announced that the Diamondbacks led 5-1 after three innings, the stadium crowd let out a loud cheer and the Arizona student section chanted “Let’s go, D’Backs”, as the Diamondbacks representative all of Arizona, including Tucson (the Diamondbacks would ultimately win the game and the series in seven games, much to the delight of the Arizona fans).

California
Attempted to look for Mackovic's first conference win, the Wildcats traveled to Berkeley to face winless California. Arizona started off slow early but would take control later on with a solid offense and blitzing defense. The Golden Bears would make things interesting late and pulled within two scores, but would not come closer as the Wildcats finally ended their Pac-10 slump and Mackovic earned his first conference victory. The win also kept Arizona's chances alive for a bowl.

Arizona State

After their loss to Stanford that ended their bowl hopes, the Wildcats went to Tempe for the annual rivalry matchup with Arizona State and treated it as their own bowl game. As the Sun Devils had a new coach, the “Duel in the Desert” had a meeting between first-year coaches for both teams.

This was the first year in modern history that the Territorial Cup, the rivalry trophy, would be awarded to the winner. The cup, which was originally awarded in 1899 in the first game between the teams and claimed to be college football's oldest rivalry trophy, went lost for decades before being discovered in 1980. Both Arizona and ASU agreed to have the cup be used for the football rivalry and that the winning team would possess it until the next season.

In the game, the Wildcats scored first and led 20–0 at one point before ASU climbed back in it to cut the lead to 20–14. However, Arizona answered to increase their lead and seemed to break it open with a defensive touchdown. By the fourth quarter, Arizona State tried to come back, but the Wildcats’ defense would come up big to seal the game and Arizona earned their first win in the rivalry since 1998 and also captured the Territorial Cup.

After the game, a fight ensued when Arizona celebrated at midfield and ASU players ran out to start a melee with them, which added more fuel to the rivalry.

With the win, Arizona finished the season with a 5–6 record, matching the previous season's record (also 5–6).

Season notes
This season would be the only successful one under Mackovic, as Arizona would decline in wins for the rest of his tenure. 

Most of the offseason was overshadowed by Arizona's basketball team's success due to their Final Four run and national title game appearance in the spring, though the football team continued preparing for the season.

Following Arizona's transition with a new coach, the Wildcats unveiled new branding for its sports teams, including a new “Arizona” wordmark (which is still in use today), as they went in a new direction at the turn of the century and millennium. The end zones at Arizona Stadium were colored in blue with the wordmark in white. Also, the words “Bear Down” were now on the sidelines near the goal lines (with “Bear” in red and “Down” in white, all in the same letter font used in the university's logo), and two little “A”s on the 25-yard lines.

Wide receiver Bobby Wade would become the de facto leader of the Arizona offense, as he would lead the team in receptions and receiving touchdowns.

The win over San Diego State is the Wildcats’ last to date over them, and the two did not meet again until 2021, with the Aztecs winning in Tucson. Also, Arizona did not play both Idaho and UNLV again until 2008 and 2013, respectively.

Following the 9/11 attacks, Arizona wore helmet stickers and patches on their uniforms for the rest of the season, commemorating the victims.

The Wildcats did not play a Big Ten team for the first time since 1994, ending a streak of six straight seasons.

Arizona struggled in Pac-10 play, and not winning until early November. The five-game losing streak was a result of poor play, tougher and talented opponents, and offensive mistakes.

The Wildcats did not play UCLA this season.

Arizona failed to score a touchdown against Oregon State for the second consecutive season, only mustering a field goal.

For the game against USC, Arizona had a large “A” logo at midfield, which remains in use to this day.

Had Arizona defeated either Washington, USC, or Stanford (they came close winning the first two), they would have been bowl-eligible.

The Wildcats claimed the Territorial Cup for the first time this season. Since then, they would win it six more times (2004, 2008, 2009, 2011, 2014, and 2016) as ASU is currently dominating the rivalry. In addition, this would be the only win over ASU under Mackovic.

Arizona State would be the only other Pac-10 school besides California that Arizona would beat in the Mackovic era (the Wildcats would defeat the Golden Bears in 2002). Also, this would be the only season under Mackovic that the Wildcats won two or more conference games.

Awards and honors
Lance Briggs, LB, First-team All-Pac-10

Clarence Farmer, RB, First-team All-Pac-10

After the season
The Wildcats attempted to improve on their 2001 record in 2002 for a chance at a bowl. However, they would continue to struggle against Pac-10 opponents and Mackovic would be become the center of controversy involving him and his treatment of his players, and fans called for his firing. The Wildcats would end with another losing season, which showed a sign that the Mackovic era would be over in the future.

References

Arizona
Arizona Wildcats football seasons
Arizona Wildcats football